Al-Fuqair Mosque or Mutsib Mosque is a mosque located in Medina, Saudi Arabia. It is narrated that the Islamic prophet Muhammad performed a prayer here once. The mosque is located in the right hand side of the main street which connects Qurban and Awali, and it is 1.9km from Quba Mosque, next to a gas station.

See also
 List of mosques in Saudi Arabia
  Lists of mosques 
 List of mosques in Medina

Mosques in Medina